Adunați is a commune in Prahova County, Muntenia, Romania. It is composed of three villages: Adunați, Ocina de Jos, and Ocina de Sus.

It lies just west of Breaza, on the border with Dâmbovița County. The river Provița flows through all three villages comprising the commune.

References

Communes in Prahova County
Localities in Muntenia